Marie-Charlotte de Balzac d’Entragues (1588-1664), was a French noble. She was the mistress to Henry IV of France in 1605-1609.  
She was the daughter of Charles Balzac d'Entragues and Marie Touchet, who was formerly the sole mistress of Charles IX of France, and the sister of Catherine Henriette de Balzac d'Entragues, also mistress of Henry IV.

References 
 Dominique Labarre de Raillicourt, Nouveau dictionnaire des biographies françaises, 1961

1588 births
1664 deaths
17th-century French women
Mistresses of Henry IV of France